Gryllus vocalis, the vocal field cricket, is a species of cricket in the subfamily Gryllinae.. It is found in North America.

Range 
This insect can be found in desert regions in North America, including Arizona, New Mexico, Texas, and Nevada.

References
https://bugguide.net/node/view/250793

vocalis
Articles created by Qbugbot
Insects described in 1901